FC Ataka Minsk was a Belarusian football club based in Minsk. They disbanded in 1998.

History
FC Ataka-407 Minsk was formed in 1986. In 1992 the team started playing in Belarusian Second League. In 1993, the team was renamed to Ataka-Aura. In the 1994–95 season, they played in the Belarusian First League and after finishing in 2nd place, they were promoted to the Premier League, where they played until 1997. After that season, the team went bankrupt and had to withdraw from the League.

Ataka's reserve team, Ataka-Aura-d Minsk started playing in the Second League since the 1994–95 season. After the main team withdrew from the Premier League and all of the main squad players left, the reserve team played one more season in the Second League in 1998 under the name Ataka-Sport Minsk and was disbanded as well.

Name changes
1986: formed as Ataka-407 Minsk
1993: renamed to Ataka-Aura Minsk
1994: reserve team formed as Ataka-Aura-d Minsk
1997: main team renamed to Ataka Minsk and disbanded after the season; reserve team renamed to Ataka-407 Minsk
1998: reserve team renamed to Ataka-Sport Minsk and disbanded after the season

League and Cup history

References

External links
Profile at footballfacts.ru

Defunct football clubs in Belarus
Association football clubs established in 1986
Association football clubs disestablished in 1998
Football clubs in Minsk
1986 establishments in Belarus
1998 disestablishments in Belarus